Choromytilus is a genus of mussel, a marine  bivalve mollusc in the family Mytilidae.

Species
 Choromytilus chorus  (Molina, 1782) 
 Choromytilus meridionalis  (Krauss, 1848) 
 Choromytilus palliopunctatus  (Carpenter, 1857)

References

Mytilidae
Bivalve genera